Are You a Dreamer? is a studio album by American singer-songwriter Denison Witmer. It was released on The Militia Group on July 26, 2005.

Track listing
(All songs written by Denison Witmer)
"Little Flowers" – 4:32
"Everything But Sleep" – 3:12
"Ringing of the Bell Tower" – 4:54
"Are You a Dreamer?" – 4:15
"East from West" – 3:22
"California Brown and Blue" – 5:04
"Castle and Cathedral" – 3:26
"Worry All the Time" – 4:03
"Grandma Mary" – 3:00
"Finding Your Feet Again" – 4:30

Personnel
 Denison Witmer – vocals, guitar, classical guitar, additional producer, engineer, artwork
 Don Peris – electric guitar, organ, classical guitar, 12-string acoustic guitar, vocal, producer, engineer, mixing
 James McAlister – drums, percussion
 Mike Bitts – bass guitar
 Sufjan Stevens – banjo ("Little Flowers"), recorder ensemble ("Everything But Sleep"), Wurlitzer ("East From West"), organ ("California Brown and Blue"), vocal ("Everything But Sleep", "Finding Your Feet Again")
 Kaleen Enke – vocal, artwork
 Karen Peris – vocal
 Katrina Kerns – vocal
 Shara Worden – vocal
 Mike Musser – additional engineer
 Ken Heitmueller – mastering
 Randall P. Jenkins – layout, photography, technical assistance

References

2005 albums
Denison Witmer albums